Amet Sound is a large body of water, an embayment of the Northumberland Strait, on the north shore Nova Scotia straddling Colchester and Pictou counties. It takes its name from Amet Island, a small island just beyond the mouth of the sound in Northumberland Strait. Because of its sheltered position, its bays and harbours are considered "safe haven" for yachts in the event of major storms.

Geography
Its inland extensions include Tatamagouche Bay to the west-southwest, Barrachois Harbour to the southwest, Brule Harbour to the south and John Bay to the southeast.

Cultural aspects
Surrounding land uses are mostly agricultural and recreational. The Barrachois Harbour Yacht Club is the focus of most recreational boating on the Sound. A Tim Horton Children's Camp is situated on Tatamagouche Bay, while Nelson Memorial Park, a municipal picnic park and floral garden is situated near Tatamagouche and the Rushtons Beach provincial day use park is located in Marshville. The main populated centres are at Tatamagouche on the Waugh River, and River John at the extreme easterly end of the sound. Historically, the area had numerous lobster canneries which were active in the first quarter of the twentieth century.

References

Bodies of water of Nova Scotia
Landforms of Pictou County
Landforms of Colchester County